WKZB (97.9 MHz, "The Buzz") is a classic hits-formatted FM radio station licensed to Newton, Mississippi broadcasting in the Meridian, Mississippi, Arbitron market. Its transmitter is located near Chunky, Mississippi.

History
On September 9, 2011, the then-WHTU changed their call letters to WUCL and changed format to classic country.

On October 28, 2016, WUCL changed their format from classic country (which moved to WJXM 105.7 FM DeKalb) to classic hits, branded as "97.9 The Buzz" as part of a three-station format shuffle. On November 8, 2016, the station assumed the WJXM call sign. On November 16, 2016 WJXM changed their call letters to WKZB.

References

External links

Classic hits radio stations in the United States
KZB